Fiends of the Eastern Front was a story published in the British comics anthology 2000 AD, created by Gerry Finley-Day and Carlos Ezquerra. The series mixed vampires into the general horror of the Eastern front.

Plot

A diary found with an unearthed skeleton casts new light on a lost piece of history from World War II. It belongs to a young German soldier who was stationed on the Eastern Front alongside a group of Romanian soldiers who always fought at night. Their true nature is soon revealed and when they change sides all Hell breaks loose.

Characters

German 
The Germans were:
 Hans Schmitt - The main Protagonist
 Karl Mueller - Hans' friend
 Inspector Brandt -  A police officer in 1980 Germany

Russian 
The Russians were:
 The Rabbi - An unnamed rabbi who performs the ritual
 The Golem - Created by the Rabbi to destroy Costanza and his Vampyr
 Jesf Charnosov - A member of SMERT KROFPEET

The Vampyr (Blood Pack) 
The Vampires were:
 Hauptmann Costanza - Vampire leader
 Colonel Grant - An alias of Costanza's
 Corporal Gorgo - Costanza's chief Lieutenant
 Corporal Cringu - Costanza's loyal thrall
 Fourteen other unnamed Vampyr followers

Bibliography

They have appeared in their own series (the original run being released as a single volume by Rebellion Developments in June 2006 and a new series starting to coincide with this) as well as cropping up elsewhere and now feature in a series of novels.

Comics  
Fiends of the Eastern Front:
 "Fiends of the Eastern Front", written by Gerry Finley-Day, art by Carlos Ezquerra, in 2000 AD #152-161, February–April 1980 (collected in hardcover, October 2005)
 "Stalingrad", written by David Bishop, art by Colin MacNeil, in Judge Dredd Megazine #245-252, May–December 2006)
 "1812", written by Ian Edginton, art by Dave Taylor, in 2000 AD #2100–2105, September 2018
 "Fiends of the Western Front", written by Ian Edginton, art by Tiernen Trevallion, in 2000 AD #2111–2115, December 2018 - January 2019

Cameo appearances in other series
Judge Dredd: "Helter Skelter" (with Garth Ennis; Carlos Ezquerra (1-7, 10-12) and Henry Flint (8-9), in 2000 AD #1250-1261, 2001)
The Scarlet Apocrypha: "Red Menace" (with Dan Abnett and Carlos Ezquerra, in Judge Dredd Megazine #4.17, 2002)
Fodder (with Hannah Berry and Dani K, in 2000AD Free Comic Book Day 2016)

Novels

Black Flame released a series of novels based on the series, all written by David Bishop:

Fiends of the Eastern Front:
 Operation Vampyr (December 2005 )
 The Blood Red Army (April 2006)
 Twilight of the Dead (August 2006)
 Fiends of the Rising Sun (July 2007)

The first three books were collected in one volume, Fiends of the Eastern Front (672 pages, February 2007)

The novel Fiends of the Rising Sun deals with the same premise but with vampire samurai in the Pacific War.

See also
Fiends of the Eastern Front: 1812 prequel story in 2000 AD
Fiends of the Western Front upcoming sequel
American Gothic, another 2000 AD story which features vampires

Other items that mix horror with the World Wars and/or feature undead Nazis include:

The Keep
The Bloody Red Baron
Return to Castle Wolfenstein
The Wolf's Hour
Shock Waves
Oasis of the Zombies
Zombie Lake
Deathwatch
Hellsing
The Bunker
30 Days of Night: Red Snow
Dead Snow

References 
Fiends of the Eastern Front at Barney

External links
Review of the trade paperback, 2000 AD Review

Comics set during World War II